Snyder Memorial Methodist Church, originally known as Trinity Methodist Episcopal Church, is a historic 1903 church in Jacksonville, Florida. It is located at 226 North Laura Street in Duval County (on the historic corner of Laura and Monroe streets). The Snyder Memorial Methodist congregation was founded in 1870, and the church was constructed following the loss of a previous church during the 1901 Jacksonville Fire on the same site as its predecessor. J. H. W. Hawkins was the building's architect. The new church was named Snyder Memorial in honor of former pastor E.B. Snyder whose children contributed to the rebuilding effort. It was later sold to the City of Jacksonville. It was added to the National Register of Historic Places on March 13, 2013.

Snyder Memorial Church was constructed in a Gothic Revival architecture style for $31,000. It is made of granite and Indiana limestone. It includes a crenelated bell tower and an intricate rose window overlooking Hemming Park. The church is owned by the City of Jacksonville.

The church played a role in civil rights activities in Jacksonville - it hosted community discussions and negotiations following Ax Handle Saturday.

See also
National Register of Historic Places listings in Duval County, Florida

References

External links
 

Churches in Jacksonville, Florida
Methodist churches in Florida
National Register of Historic Places in Jacksonville, Florida
1903 establishments in Florida
Churches completed in 1903
Laura Street